Gumbe, also goombay or gumbay, is a West African style of music found in countries such as Sierra Leone and Guinea-Bissau. Sierra Leonean gumbe music is indigenous to the Sierra Leone Creole people and was derived from the Jamaican Maroon ancestors of the Creole people. Creole musicians such as Ebenezer Calendar and Dr Oloh popularized gumbe music in Sierra Leone and in other West African locales.

Etymology
It is likely that the etymology of African-American musical genres goombay of the Bahamas originates in Guinea-Bissau gumbe. Gombey music from Bermuda and the Jamaican square maroon drum called goombay could also be related.

Origins
Gumbe is a specific genre, mostly influenced by the fast tempo zouk style called "zouk béton" (music of the French Caribbean popularized by Kassav in the 1980s); though the same term also refers to any music of the country.  True gumbe is a fusion of several Bissau Guinean folk traditions.  Gumbe is the genre most closely associated with Bissau Guinean music worldwide.

Gumbe is a primarily vocal and percussive music that has been associated with nationalist thought since colonial times.

See also
Gumbe (drum)

References 

 BBC - World Review - Manecas Costa, Paraiso di Gumbe

West African music
Sierra Leone Creole music
Sierra Leone Creole people